The large-toothed hairy-tailed rat (Batomys dentatus) is one of five species of rodent in the genus Batomys. It is in the diverse family Muridae.
This species is found only in Philippines.
Its natural habitat is subtropical or tropical dry forests.

References

 Heaney, L. 1996.  Batomys dentatus.   2006 IUCN Red List of Threatened Species.   Downloaded on 9 July 2007.

Rats of Asia
Batomys
Endemic fauna of the Philippines
Rodents of the Philippines
Mammals described in 1911
Taxonomy articles created by Polbot